Cheryl Walker (August 1, 1918 – October 24, 1971) was an American fashion model and actress.

Early years

Born in South Pasadena, California to Everett Dale and Pauline S. Walker, she attended Pasadena Junior College, where she was a champion swimmer. Walker won the 1938 Tournament of Roses pageant leading to a brief career as a model and the beginning of a brief film career.

Career 
On January 4, 1938, Walker signed a contract with Paramount Pictures. She appeared in small, uncredited roles in several films from 1938 until her first substantial role in Chasing Trouble (1940) with Frankie Darro. She briefly took the name Sharon Lee for the film Secrets of a Model (1940), which provided her first starring role, before returning to minor roles. She was Veronica Lake's double in the film Sullivan's Travels (1941), and was the female lead in Shadows on the Sage (1942). She also was Claudette Colbert's stand-in on No Time for Love. Her most substantial role was in Stage Door Canteen (1943) in which she played a hostess at the canteen who meets and falls in love with a serviceman. She continued appearing in films until her retirement in 1948.

Later years 
In the late 1950s, Walker traveled throughout Southern California giving speeches to civic and church groups on "the menace of communism". She belonged to the San Marino Republican Women's Club and co-founded and was president of the Tuesday Morning Study Club which presented annual patriotism awards to anti-communist activists such as George Putnam, Baxter Ward, Matt Cvetic, Chief William Parker, Congressman Donald Jackson, and Jenkin Lloyd Jones.

Personal life 
On December 16, 1940, Walker married Dr. Jay Etzell Coumbe; they had one daughter, Dayle. They later divorced. She married, secondly, to Tway W. Andrews, who survived her.

Death 
Walker died of cancer at Huntington Memorial Hospital in Pasadena.

References

External links
 
 
 
 Allmovie

1918 births
1971 deaths
California Republicans
Female models from California
American film actresses
Deaths from cancer in California
People from Pasadena, California
Actresses from California
20th-century American actresses